The president of the South Australian Legislative Council is the presiding officer of the South Australian Legislative Council, the upper house of the Parliament of South Australia. The other presiding officer is the speaker of the South Australian House of Assembly.

List of presidents of the Legislative Council

References

 Statistical Record of the Legislature 1836 - 2007

South Australia